Shaq's Big Challenge is a reality television show hosted by Shaquille O'Neal that debuted on ABC with its first episode on June 26, 2007, and concluded its first season on July 31, 2007. It featured Shaq's efforts to help six severely obese middle school aged children from Broward County, Florida lose weight and gain a healthy lifestyle. It aired on Tuesdays at 9:00 pm ET/PT and 8:00 pm CT on ABC.

The events of the six episodes take place over a period of nine months. The challenge was originally scheduled to last five months, but near the end, Shaq and the kids decided to extend it another four months. All kids started out in either the obese or the morbidly obese category and were unable to produce adequate results in the President's Physical Fitness Test, and by the end they were all within the normal or overweight categories and passed the President's Physical Fitness Test in all areas.

The show debuted to low ratings, though it can be attributed, and is attributed by ABC as well as critics, to the fact that the show shared a time slot with the highly successful America's Got Talent and reruns of the immensely popular House. Critics, parents, and educational institutions lauded the show for its accuracy, humor, emotion, sincerity, and lack of exploitation.

The two schools featured in the show are Pines Middle School and Olsen Middle School, both of which are part of Broward County Public Schools.

Shaq's Team

The Kids

The Experts

Episodes

References

External links
Official Website

2000s American reality television series
2007 American television series debuts
2007 American television series endings
American Broadcasting Company original programming
Shaquille O'Neal
Television series by Banijay
Television shows set in Florida